Parmouti 10 - Coptic Calendar - Parmouti 12

The eleventh day of the Coptic month of Parmouti, the eighth month of the Coptic year. In common years, this day corresponds to April 6, of the Julian Calendar, and April 19, of the Gregorian Calendar. This day falls in the Coptic Season of Shemu, the season of the Harvest.

Commemorations

Saints 

 The departure of Saint Theodora the Nun 
 The departure of Saint John, Bishop of Gaza

References 

Days of the Coptic calendar